Straight Life may refer to:

Music
 "The Straight Life", a 1968 song by Sonny Curtis, covered by Bobby Goldsboro
 Straight Life (Freddie Hubbard album), 1970
 Straight Life (Art Pepper album), 1979
 Straight Life (Jimmy Smith album), 2007 (recorded 1961)

Other media
 Straight Life (book), a 1979 autobiography by Art Pepper and Laurie Pepper
 "Straight Life" (Oz), a television episode